This is a list of singles that charted in the top ten of the Billboard Hot 100, an all-genre singles chart, in 2013.

During the year, 62 songs and 59 acts charted in the tier, and 34 of these acts scored their first top-ten single in the US either as a lead or featured artist. Drake had the most top tens in 2013, with four, while Lorde's debut single "Royals" became the longest-running top-ten single of the year, spending twenty-three consecutive weeks in the tier. Macklemore and Ryan Lewis spent the most consecutive weeks in the top ten during 2013, with thirty-two spanning from January 5 to August 10.

Top-ten singles
Key
 – indicates single's top 10 entry was also its Hot 100 debut
 – indicates Best performing song of the year
(#) – 2013 year-end top 10 single position and rank

2012 peaks

2014 peaks

See also
2013 in American music
List of Hot 100 number-one singles of 2013 (U.S.)
Billboard Year-End Hot 100 singles of 2013
List of Billboard Hot 100 top 10 singles in 2012

Notes

The single re-entered the top ten on the week ending January 12, 2013.
The single re-entered the top ten on the week ending January 19, 2013.
The single re-entered the top ten on the week ending February 23, 2013.
The single re-entered the top ten on the week ending March 16, 2013.
The single re-entered the top ten on the week ending March 23, 2013.
The single re-entered the top ten on the week ending May 11, 2013.
The single re-entered the top ten on the week ending May 18, 2013.
The single re-entered the top ten on the week ending June 22, 2013.
 The single re-entered the top ten on the week ending July 13, 2013.
 The single re-entered the top ten on the week ending September 21, 2013.
 The single re-entered the top ten on the week ending October 5, 2013.
 The single re-entered the top ten on the week ending December 21, 2013.
 The single re-entered the top ten on the week ending December 28, 2013.

References

External links
Billboard.com
Billboard.biz
The Billboard Hot 100

United States Hot 100 Top Ten Singles
2013